Donald Clement McMurchie was an American politician who served as the 21st Lieutenant Governor of South Dakota from 1937 to 1941, firstly under Leslie Jensen and secondly under Harlan J. Bushfield, for the Republican Party.

Biography 
McMurchie was born on October 2, 1896, in Clay County, South Dakota to James Duncan McMurchie and Jane Davis. He served as Lieutenant Governor of South Dakota from 1937 to 1941 for the Republican Party. McMurchie died on November 20, 1981, in Sioux Falls, South Dakota and was buried in Wakonda, South Dakota.

References 

1896 births
1981 deaths
Lieutenant Governors of South Dakota